Phacelia austromontana is a species of phacelia known by the common name Southern Sierra phacelia. It is native to the southwestern United States, where it can be found in the Transverse Ranges and Sierra Nevada of California east to Utah. It grows in open mountainous habitat.

It is an annual herb growing prostrate or upright, its multibranched stem reaching up to about 27 centimeters long. It is glandular and coated in soft and coarse hairs. The lance-shaped to oval pointed leaves are 1 to 3 centimeters long and have few or no lobes. The hairy, glandular inflorescence is a one-sided curving or coiling cyme of many bell-shaped flowers. Each flower is lavender or light blue and no more than 6 millimeters long.

External links
Jepson Manual Treatment: Phacelia austromontana
Phacelia austromontana — U.C. Photo gallery

austromontana
Flora of California
Flora of Nevada
Flora of Utah
Flora of the Great Basin
Flora of the California desert regions
Flora of the Sierra Nevada (United States)
Natural history of the California chaparral and woodlands
Natural history of the Mojave Desert
Natural history of the Transverse Ranges
Flora without expected TNC conservation status